Lindokuhle "Linda" Mkhwanazi (born 12 July 1985) is a South African Association football player who played as a defensive midfielder in the South African Premier Soccer League.

Career
Since making his professional debut on 19 October 2007 – when Pirates went on the rampage, beating Bloemfontein Celtic 3–0 in an ABSA Premiership game.

International career
Mkhwanazi has been competing at an international level with the Under-23 Olympic team.

References

1985 births
Living people
People from Richards Bay
South African soccer players
Association football midfielders
Orlando Pirates F.C. players
Thanda Royal Zulu F.C. players
South African Premier Division players